, also known as 札大 (Satsu-dai) for an abbreviation, is a private university in Sapporo, Japan. It was founded in 1967. In 2018, 2775 students were enrolled at the university, including 103 foreign students.

Teaching staff
Yūtokutaishi Akiyama, artist
Carlo Forlivesi, composer
Tama Morita, writer

Junior college

The junior college department was established in 1968.

Alumni
Kazuya Kawabata, footballer
Shoji Mitarai(Ph.D), visiting scholar at Harvard University (assisted with Japan Ministry of Education's Negotiation Research project grant); Chairman of Japan Institute of Negotiation,& On the committee for the America-Japan Society of Hokkaido. On the drums for the Hokkaido Ventures.

References

External links
Sapporo University official site

Universities and colleges in Sapporo
Private universities and colleges in Japan
Hokkaido American Football Association